David Collins (1 March 1955 – 17 July 2013) was an Irish architect who specialised in designing the interiors of bars and restaurants in London.

Biography

Early life
David Collins was born in Dublin, Ireland on 1 March 1955. He studied architecture at the Bolton Street School of Architecture in Dublin.

Career
He established the David Collins Studio, an interior design firm based in London, in 1985. One of his first interior designs was chef Pierre Koffmann's La Tante Claire in Chelsea. He then designed chef Marco Pierre White's (now defunct) Harvey's Harveys (restaurant) in 1988. Later, he designed The Gilbert Scott, chef Marcus Wareing's restaurant at the St Pancras Renaissance Hotel. Another Wareing restaurant that he designed was the Blue Bar in Belgravia. He went on to design The Wolseley, the Delaunay Hotel, J Sheekey,  Brasserie Zédel, Colbert, Gordon Ramsay at Royal Hospital Road, and Nobu Berkeley St. He also designed retail interiors for Jimmy Choo, Alexander McQueen and Harrods.

Additionally, he designed The Charles, an apartment building on the Upper East Side in New York City. He was a close friend of Madonna: he designed her London and New York apartments and she used a poem that he wrote as the basis of her 1998 song "Drowned World/Substitute for Love", for which he received a co-writing credit.

Influence 
David Collins's design and aesthetic has had a huge impact, which was part of what led him to be named to the 2012 AD100 list. Simon Mills of Wallpaper* magazine said that "It is no exaggeration to say that the restaurant and hotel revolution in London of the last two decades would not have been the same without him."

Death
Collins died in London on 17 July 2013 from melanoma only three weeks after being diagnosed.

Legacy
A book that Collins had been working on was published posthumously in May 2014 and the Studio celebrated its 35th anniversary in 2020.

See also

References

External links

1955 births
2013 deaths
Architects from Dublin (city)
Designers from London
Interior designers
Irish expatriates in the United Kingdom